William Eastgate Batchelor (17 July 1840 – 28 November 1915) was an Australian politician.

He was born in London. In 1903 he was elected to the Tasmanian House of Assembly as the member for North Launceston. He was defeated in 1906. Batchelor died in Launceston in 1915.

References

1840 births
1915 deaths
Members of the Tasmanian House of Assembly
British emigrants to Australia